The 1993 World Sambo Championships were held in Kstovo, Russia on 1993. Championships were organized by FIAS.

Medals

External links 
Results on Sambo.net.ua

World Sambo Championships